Birmil Tehsil is a subdivision located in South Waziristan district, Khyber Pakhtunkhwa, Pakistan. The population is 104,304 according to the 2017 census. The Tehsil has a diverse collection of vegetation.

See also 
 List of tehsils of Khyber Pakhtunkhwa
 Barmal District

References 

Tehsils of Khyber Pakhtunkhwa
Populated places in South Waziristan